Beáta Bena Green is a South African actress, model, and entrepreneur. She was crowned Miss Teen South African 2013. She is best known for playing Shady in the award winning South African Soapie 7de Laan, Sienna in Deepstate 2 and Kim Claasen in Kyknet & Kie's Telenovela Arendsvlei.

Early life and education
Green is from the Western Cape and attended Hottentots Holland High School in Somerset West where she participated in school productions and school radio. She went on to graduate from Stellenbosch University. Her cousin Tamaryn Green was crowned Miss South Africa 2018, and 1st runner-up at Miss Universe 2018.

Career
In 2013, Green was crowned Miss Teenager South Africa. In 2017, she won the provincial category at Miss Mamelodi Sundowns. Then in 2020, she participated to the Miss South Africa 2020.

Green made her television debut in 2018 on KykNet telenovela Arendsvlei in the role of Kim. In 2019, she played Tasneem in the Die Spreeus and Siena in Deep State. In 2020, she joined the cast of the Afrikaans TV soap opera 7de Laan as Shady Vermeulen.

Filmography

References

External links
 

Living people
Cape Coloureds
South African beauty pageant winners
South African female models
South African soap opera actresses
Stellenbosch University alumni
1996 births